Donald G. Batchelor (June 15, 1895 - September 25, 1970) was a professional football player who spent two years of the National Football League with the Canton Bulldogs and the Toledo Maroons. Batchelor won an NFL championship with the Bulldogs in 1922. In 1923, he played for the Maroons.

After his professional football career, Don settled in Grand Blanc, Michigan. He later worked as a school teacher, a coach, and was a Republican representative to the Michigan state constitutional convention for Genesee County (2nd District) in 1961. The convention convened in Lansing on October 3, 1961, and adjourned on August 1, 1962. He was also a member of the Disciples of Christ and the Freemasons.

Family
Don was the son of George Batchelor and Cora (Babb) Batchelor. He was married to Grace F. Dibble.

Notes

1895 births
1970 deaths
People from Hicksville, Ohio
Players of American football from Ohio
Canton Bulldogs players
Toledo Maroons players
Michigan Republicans
Grove City College alumni
Ohio Northern Polar Bears football players
People from Grand Blanc, Michigan